Kuchchaveli or Kuchaveli is a coastal town located North-West of Trincomalee, Trincomalee District, Sri Lanka.

References 

Towns in Trincomalee District
Kuchchaveli DS Division